Aurelijus Veryga (born 8 August 1976)  is a Lithuanian politician. He served as Minister of Health in the Skvernelis Cabinet led by Prime Minister Saulius Skvernelis from 13 December 2016 to 11 December 2020.

References 

Living people
1976 births
Place of birth missing (living people)
21st-century Lithuanian politicians
Health ministers of Lithuania
Members of the Seimas